Bidenichthys capensis, the freetail brotula, is an uncommon South African fish of the family Bythitidae, and one of three species, and the type species, of the genus Bidenichthys. The species is found in intertidal zones and rocky tidepools ranging from East London to the Cape of Good Hope, South Africa. It grows up to 90 mm long TL.

References

Bythitidae
Fish of Africa
Fish of South Africa
Taxa named by Keppel Harcourt Barnard
Fish described in 1934